Lye rolls are a baked specialty in Germany (especially in Bavaria and Swabia), France (Alsace), Austria, and Switzerland. They are made by immersing bread rolls in a lye solution before baking. The German name is Laugengebäck for any baked good dipped in lye. The perhaps best known shape is the pretzel, while rolls or buns are specifically called Laugensemmel or Kastanie (Bavarian), Laugeweckle or Laugestängle (Swabian), and Laugenwecken, Laugenbrötchen or Laugenstange (everywhere else in Germany); Laugenweckerl in Austria; Silserli or Laugenbrötli in Switzerland. In some parts of Asia they are known as laugen rolls.

In France, the lye roll is known as mauricette and was invented by Paul Poulaillon in Alsace region when he opened the first Poulaillon bakery in 1973. It was later registered as a trademark with an alternate name Moricette in 1985 and the lard was replaced by canola oil.

Lye

In order to cause a Maillard reaction during baking for the characteristic browning effect, a lye roll needs to be coated with a high pH (alkaline) solution. The higher the pH, the stronger the reaction. Lye (sodium hydroxide (NaOH) or potassium hydroxide (KOH)) is a highly alkaline agent most commonly used for the purpose. However, lye is not the only way to produce this result: a baking soda or washing soda solution, which is easier to handle and safer to use, will provide a similar product but will not provide as strong a reaction, so the effect will be less pronounced. Lye is the strongest agent, followed by washing soda, then baking soda.

The same solution is also used for preparing pretzels; outside of German-speaking countries they are often the only baked food commonly glazed with a lye solution.

Presentation
Both lye rolls and pretzels are typically covered with salt, preferably pretzel salt, a large-grained salt made from compressed smaller salt particles, which reduces moisture absorption and the hardness of the salt grain. As a snack, lye rolls may also be sold as sandwiches or covered with baked cheese, although this is more recent and less common. Typically they are cut in half and buttered, as large soft pretzels often are in Germany and Switzerland as well. Other toppings for lye rolls nowadays also include poppyseed, sesame, and other seeds as an alternative to salt.

In Germany, they are sold in many shapes and forms, many with unique names. For example, Laugenstange (“Lye bar”) are long oval rolls, while Laugenbrötchen (“Lye rolls”) are small round rolls.

See also

 Other foods prepared with lye, such as Lutefisk, Hominy, and Chinese noodles

References

Breads
German breads
Bavarian cuisine
Swabian cuisine
Swiss breads
Austrian cuisine